Esther Laura Talitha de Lange (born 18 February 1984) is a Dutch international cricketer who debuted for the Dutch national side in 2005, and was appointed its captain in 2015. A right-arm off spin bowler, she has so far played fifteen One Day International (ODI) and six Twenty20 International matches.

De Lange was born in Amsterdam, and plays her club cricket for Kampong CC. She first played for a Dutch representative team at the age of 18, when she played a single match at the 2002 European Under-21 Championship in Ireland. De Lange made her senior debut for the Netherlands at the 2005 European Championship in Wales, taking 0/20 on her ODI debut against Ireland. She did not make another appearance at that level until the 2010 edition of the same tournament, which again came against Ireland. Later in the year, de Lange was selected in the Dutch squad for the ICC Women's Challenge in South Africa, which featured five other teams playing both ODI and T20I tournaments. Against Pakistan in the ODI tournament, she took 4/43 from 10 overs, a personal best.

In April 2011, de Lange played for the Dutch side in two ODI and T20I tournaments hosted by Sri Lanka, with the other teams being Ireland, Pakistan, and Sri Lanka. Her best performance there was 3/16 in an ODI against Ireland, which the Netherlands went on to lose by only a single run. At the 2011 World Cup Qualifier in Bangladesh, she was her team's leading wicket-taker, finishing with five wickets overall and a best of 3/45 against South Africa. As a result of its failure to finish in the top six at that tournament, the Netherlands lost both its ODI status and its T20I status, meaning de Lange has played no further matches in either of those formats. In ODIs, she is ranked in the top 10 for both wickets taken and best bowling average for the Netherlands.

After the World Cup Qualifier, the next major international event for de Lange was the 2012 European T20 Championship, which saw the Netherlands qualify for the 2013 World Twenty20 Qualifier in Ireland. At the World Twenty20 Qualifier, however, she went wicketless from five matches, the only specialist Dutch bowler to do so. De Lange spent the 2013–14 Northern Hemisphere off-season playing in Australia, turning out for a Perth club, Midland-Guildford. Prior to the 2015 season, it was announced that she would replace Denise Hannema as captain of the Netherlands. Her first international tournament as captain is the 2015 World Twenty20 Qualifier in Thailand.

References

External links

1984 births
Living people
Dutch women cricketers
Netherlands women One Day International cricketers
Netherlands women Twenty20 International cricketers
Sportspeople from Amsterdam
Dutch expatriates in Australia
Dutch women cricket captains